Zhuj Selmani (c. 1844-1875) was an Albanian partisan and an early proponent of the Albanian National Awakening. He was one of the leaders of the Albanian resistance against the Kingdom of Montenegro. At the beginning of the Great Eastern Crisis Albanians responded with armed resistance. Zhuj Selmani fought from his tower house (kulla) known as the tower of Sheremeti (Albanian: Kulla e Sheremetit). Surrounded by Montenegrin forces in his tower, he blew it up, killing himself and many of the enemy soldiers.

Biography
Zhuj Selmani was born in the village of Koshutan near Pejë, in the Rugova highland in 1844, Ottoman Kosovo. He was the son of Selman Muçë Zymeraj, from the Lucëgjekaj clan of the Muriqi brotherhood, part of the wider Kelmendi tribe.

1875 border clash
In 1878, Montenegrin forces attacked Zhuj Selmani and his friends in their tower. After many attacks and being surrounded tightly after many sieges, Selmani was severely injured. When hearing upon that the Montenegrins were planning on taking them alive to Cetinje, he fired upon the gunpowder in the tower, killing himself and many of the Montenegrin forces. 

Oral sources reportedly said that Zhuj Selmani stayed in his tower for about 10 years. During this time, he often played the Lahuta, usually singing of the heroic acts of his predecessors. Selmani managed to give his friends courage to resist when the Montenegrins attacked. He was around 30 years old and not married. Recently there was a celebration of his 138th anniversary, and a statue of him was placed in one of Peja's public squares.

Legacy

Selmani appears in Albanian folklore epic songs. In Kosovo, Albanian folkloric songs refer to the exploits of Selmani, the weapons he used and the Sheremet tower.

See also
Battle of Novšiće
Sali Jaha

References

1844 births
1875 deaths
19th-century Albanian people
Military personnel from Peja
19th-century Albanian military personnel
Kosovo Albanians
Activists of the Albanian National Awakening